Joseph Hillel Silverman (born March 27, 1955, New York City) is a professor of mathematics at Brown University working in arithmetic geometry, arithmetic dynamics, and cryptography.

Biography
Joseph Silverman received an Sc.B. from Brown University in 1977 and a Ph.D. from Harvard University in 1982 under the direction of John Tate.  He taught at M.I.T. (1982–1986) and at Boston University (1986–1988) before taking a position at Brown in 1988.

Silverman has published more than 100 research articles, written or coauthored six books, and edited three conference proceedings; his work has been cited more than 5000 times, by over 2000 distinct authors.  He currently serves on the editorial boards of Algebra and Number Theory and New York Journal of Mathematics.

Industry
In 1996, Silverman, along with Jeffrey Hoffstein, Jill Pipher and Daniel Lieman, founded NTRU Cryptosystems, Inc. to market their cryptographic algorithms, NTRUEncrypt and NTRUSign.

Awards
In 2012 he became a fellow of the American Mathematical Society.

Books
Silverman has written two graduate texts on elliptic curves, The Arithmetic of Elliptic Curves (1986) and Advanced Topics in the Arithmetic of Elliptic Curves (1994).  For these two books he received a Steele Prize for Mathematical Exposition from the American Mathematical Society, which cited them by saying that “Silverman's volumes have become standard references on one of the most exciting areas of algebraic geometry and number theory.” Silverman has also written three undergraduate texts: Rational Points on Elliptic Curves (1992, co-authored with John Tate),  A Friendly Introduction to Number Theory (3rd ed. 2005), and  An Introduction to Mathematical Cryptography (2008, co-authored with Jeffrey Hoffstein and Jill Pipher). Additional graduate-level texts authored by Silverman are Diophantine Geometry: An Introduction (2000, co-authored with Marc Hindry) and The Arithmetic of Dynamical Systems (2007).

Publications
.
.
.
. 
.
.
.
.

Notes

External links
 
Joseph Silverman's home page
1998 Steele Prizes awarded by the American Mathematical Society

Living people
1955 births
20th-century American mathematicians
21st-century American mathematicians
Arithmetic geometers
Brown University alumni
Harvard University alumni
Brown University faculty
Fellows of the American Mathematical Society
Massachusetts Institute of Technology School of Science faculty